In mathematics, specifically in topology, a pseudo-Anosov map is a type of a diffeomorphism or homeomorphism of a surface. It is a generalization of a linear Anosov diffeomorphism of the torus. Its definition relies on the notion of a measured foliation introduced by William Thurston, who also coined the term "pseudo-Anosov diffeomorphism" when he proved his classification of diffeomorphisms of a surface.

Definition of a measured foliation 
A measured foliation F on a closed surface S is a geometric structure on S which consists of a singular foliation and a measure in the transverse direction. In some neighborhood of a regular point of F, there is a "flow box" φ: U → R2 which sends the leaves of F to the horizontal lines in R2. If two such neighborhoods Ui and Uj overlap then there is a transition function φij defined on φj(Uj), with the standard property

 

which must have the form

 

for some constant c. This assures that along a simple curve, the variation in y-coordinate, measured locally in every chart, is a geometric quantity (i.e. independent of the chart) and permits the definition of a total variation along a simple closed curve on S. A finite number of singularities of F of the type of "p-pronged saddle", p≥3, are allowed. At such a singular point, the differentiable structure of the surface is modified to make the point into a conical point with the total angle πp. The notion of a diffeomorphism of S is redefined with respect to this modified differentiable structure. With some technical modifications, these definitions extend to the case of a surface with boundary.

Definition of a pseudo-Anosov map 
A homeomorphism

of a closed surface S is called pseudo-Anosov if there exists a transverse pair of measured foliations on S, Fs (stable) and Fu (unstable), and a real number λ > 1 such that the foliations are preserved by f and their transverse measures are multiplied by 1/λ and λ. The number λ is called the stretch factor or dilatation of f.

Significance 
Thurston constructed a compactification of the Teichmüller space T(S) of a surface S such that the action induced on T(S) by any diffeomorphism f of S extends to a homeomorphism of the Thurston compactification. The dynamics of this homeomorphism is the simplest when f is a pseudo-Anosov map: in this case, there are two fixed points on the Thurston boundary, one attracting and one repelling, and the homeomorphism behaves similarly to a hyperbolic automorphism of the Poincaré half-plane. A "generic" diffeomorphism of a surface of genus at least two is isotopic to a pseudo-Anosov diffeomorphism.

Generalization 
Using the theory of train tracks, the notion of a pseudo-Anosov map has been extended to self-maps of graphs (on the topological side) and outer automorphisms of free groups (on the algebraic side). This leads to an analogue of Thurston classification for the case of automorphisms of free groups, developed by Bestvina and Handel.

References
A. Casson, S. Bleiler, "Automorphisms of Surfaces after Nielsen and Thurston", (London Mathematical Society Student Texts 9), (1988).
A. Fathi, F. Laudenbach, and V. Poénaru, "Travaux de Thurston sur les surfaces," Asterisque, Vols. 66 and 67 (1979).
R. C. Penner. "A construction of pseudo-Anosov homeomorphisms", Trans. Amer. Math. Soc., 310 (1988) No 1, 179–197

Dynamical systems
Geometric topology
Homeomorphisms